Europium compounds are compounds formed by the lanthanide metal europium (Eu). In these compounds, europium generally exhibits the +3 oxidation state, such as EuCl3, Eu(NO3)3 and Eu(CH3COO)3. Compounds with europium in the +2 oxidation state are also known. The +2 ion of europium is the most stable divalent ion of lanthanide metals in aqueous solution. Lipophilic europium complexes often feature acetylacetonate-like ligands, e.g., Eufod.

Chalcogenides

Oxides 

Europium(II) oxide can be obtained by the reduction of europium(III) oxide with metallic europium at high temperature. It has a rock-salt structure, is a deep red solid, and is ferromagnetic at 77 K. It has the potential to become a magnetic refrigeration material (ΔSmag=−143 mg/cm3 K，50 kOe). Europium(II) sulfide is also ferromagnetic, but europium(II) telluride is antiferromagnetic. The mixed valence oxide Eu3O4 of europium can be obtained by reducing europium(III) oxide with a reducing agent in a hydrogen atmosphere, such as:

 2 Eu2O3 + 2 EuOCl + 2 LiH → 2 Eu3O4 + 2 LiCl + H2↑

Europium(III) oxide is the most stable oxide of europium, a light pink solid with a high melting point, which can be obtained by the thermal decomposition of europium(III) nitrate. It reacts with water to give EuOOH. The reaction of soluble europium salts with ammonia or sodium hydroxide can precipitate hydroxide Eu(OH)3, but in the presence of polyhydroxyl compounds (such as glucose), the precipitation is incomplete.

Other chalcogenides 

Europium(III) sulfide can be obtained by the decomposition of Eu(Et2NCS2)3 then at 500~600 °C. Europium(III) sulfide can also be obtained by the decomposition of the thiocyanate Eu(NCS)3; Its two crystal forms, α-type and γ-type, belong to orthorhombic and cubic crystal systems, respectively. Europium(II) sulfide is prepared by sulfiding the oxide at temperatures sufficiently high to decompose europium(III) oxide:

Eu2O3 + 3 H2S → 2 EuS + 3 H2O + S

Europium oxysulfide is obtained by reacting europium(III) oxide in a carbon disulfide/argon/low pressure oxygen stream. It is a solid of the triclinic crystal system, space group Pm1, and its optical band gap is 4.4 eV. Europium oxyselenide and europium oxytelluride can be prepared by reacting europium(III) oxide with selenium or tellurium at 600 °C. The oxyselenide is heated in air and oxidized to oxyselenite. A similar reaction occurs with oxytelluride to give Eu2TeO6.

Eu(H2O) and Eu(H2O)2 complexes can be obtained by the reaction of metallic europium in solid argon with water. Eu(H2O) is rearranged to obtain HEuOH, which is further decomposed into EuO and H2; Eu(H2O)2 is decomposed into Eu(OH)2 and H2.

Halides 

Europium metal reacts with all the halogens:
2 Eu + 3 X2 → 2 EuX3 (X = F, Cl, Br, I)
This route gives white europium(III) fluoride (EuF3), yellow europium(III) chloride (EuCl3), gray europium(III) bromide (EuBr3), and colorless europium(III) iodide (EuI3). Europium also forms the corresponding dihalides: yellow-green europium(II) fluoride (EuF2), colorless europium(II) chloride (EuCl2) (although it has a bright blue fluorescence under UV light), colorless europium(II) bromide (EuBr2), and green europium(II) iodide (EuI2).

Europium can form four halides of the form EuX3 (X = F, Cl, Br, I). They are strong electrolytes in water, and all but the fluoride are soluble in water. Anhydrous europium halides can be prepared by reacting oxides or the halides' hydrates:
 Eu2O3 + 6 NH4Cl → 2 EuCl3 + 3 H2O + 6 NH3↑
 EuCl3·6H2O + 6 SOCl2 → EuCl3 + 6 SO2↑ + 12 HCl↑
Among them, europium(III) iodide can only be obtained by reacting europium(III) oxide and hydroiodic acid, and europium(II) iodide can obtained by direct treating the reagent with ammonium iodide.

Oxygenated salts 

Europium(II) sulfate is the sulfate of divalent europium, which can be obtained by electrolysis of europium sulfate solution with mercury as the cathode, or by reducing europium(III) chloride with zinc amalgam, and then reacting with sulfuric acid. It reacts with sodium carbonate or ammonium oxalate to obtain europium(II) carbonate and europium(II) oxalate, respectively:

 EuSO4 + Na2CO3 + xH2O → EuCO3·xH2O + Na2SO4
 EuSO4 + (NH4)2C2O4(saturated) + H2O → EuC2O4·H2O + (NH4)2SO4

Europium(III) sulfate can be directly obtained by reacting europium(III) oxide and dilute sulfuric acid, and crystallized, and dehydration of hydrate can obtain anhydrous. Europium(III) sulfate is soluble in water, and its octahydrate has a solubility of 2.56 g at 20 °C. Europium(III) sulfite (Eu2(SO3)3·nH2O，n=0, 3, 6) and its basic salt (EuOHSO3·4H2O) are known, and heating the sulfite in a carbon monoxide atmosphere will dehydrate to obtain anhydrous, and after Eu2O2SO4, finally obtain the oxysulfide Eu2O2S.

Europium(III) nitrate can be obtained by reacting europium(III) oxide and nitric acid and crystallizing. The crystal is dried with 45~55% sulfuric acid to obtain hexahydrate. Its anhydrous form can be obtained by the reaction of europium oxide and dinitrogen tetroxide, while heating the hydrate can only obtain the basic salt EuONO3. Europium(III) phosphate can be obtained by reacting europium(III) chloride and diammonium hydrogen phosphate (or europium(III) oxide and 5 mol/L phosphoric acid), and its white monohydrate precipitates from solution. It loses water at 600~800 °C, and changes from a hexagonal phase with water to anhydrous monoclinic phase. Europium(III) oxide reacts with arsenic pentoxide to obtain europium(III) arsenate, which is a colorless crystal with a xenotime structure.

Europium(III) carbonate is one of the carbonates of europium, which can be obtained by reacting a dilute solution of sodium bicarbonate saturated with carbon dioxide with a soluble europium salt. It is heated and decomposed to generate europium(III) oxide and carbon dioxide. Its basic salts and double salts are known. Europium(III) acetate is a pale pink solid that can crystallize from an aqueous solution as the tetrahydrate, which is dried with sulfuric acid to give the trihydrate. The reaction of europium(III) nitrate and oxalic acid gave europium oxalate decahydrate, which was converted to pentahydrate at 100 °C. Using potassium oxalate as raw material can only get double salt KEu(C2O4)2·2H2O. The coordination polymer [Eu(C2O4)(HCOO)]n can be obtained by reacting europium oxalate and oxalic acid with oxalic acid at 200 °C. Europium(III) oxalate is heated to 320 °C in a carbon dioxide atmosphere to obtain europium oxalate:

 Eu2(C2O4)3 → 2 EuC2O4 + 2 CO2↑

Organoeuropium compounds 

Organoeuropium compounds are a class of organic metal compounds containing Eu-C bonds. The cyclopentadienyl complexes of europium were studied in the early stage. They can be prepared by the reaction of sodium cyclopentadienide and anhydrous europium halide in tetrahydrofuran, such as:
 EuCl3 + 3 C5H5Na → (C5H5)3Eu + 3 NaCl
 EuI2 + 2 (C5HiPr4)Na → (C5HiPr4)2Eu + 2 NaI
Europium triisopropylocene is a brown solid that can be reacted with hydrogen peroxide to give cyclopentadiene europium peroxide; europium bis(tetraisopropylocene) is an orange-red solid that can be melted at 165 °C. The complex of cyclononatetraene and europium(II) can be prepared by a similar method, and its toluene solution emits blue-green fluorescence at 516 nm, compared with other organic europium(II) sandwich complexes (about 630 nm) with a clear blue shift.

In addition to the preparation of organo-europium compounds by metathesis reaction, metal europium can also be directly involved in the reaction, such as the reaction of europium and pentamethylcyclopentadiene to generate light orange bis(pentamethylcyclopentadiene) europium; and the reaction between cyclooctatetraene and europium gives the pale green cyclooctatetraene europium.

Applications 
Compounds of Eu3+ can emit red light under excitation. For example, europium(III) oxide can be used in picture tube televisions and europium-doped yttrium oxysulfide (Y2O2S:Eu3+) can be used as phosphors. In addition, europium compounds can also be used in the manufacture of anti-counterfeiting materials. Europium(III) phosphide is a semiconductor used in high power, high frequency applications and in laser diodes.

Based on the properties of europium(II) oxide, thin layers of europium(II) oxide deposited on silicon are being studied for use as spin filters. Spin filter materials only allow electrons of a certain spin to pass, blocking electron of the opposite spin. The synthesis of europium(II) oxide, as well as its europium(II) sulfide, because of their potential as laser window materials, insulating ferromagnets, ferromagnetic semiconductors, and magnetoresistant, optomagnetic, and luminescent materials. Europium(II) sulfide was used in an experiment providing evidence of Majorana fermions relevant to quantum computing and the production of qubits.

Eu(fod)3 serves as a Lewis acid catalyst in organic synthesis including stereoselective Diels-Alder and aldol addition reactions. For example, Eu(fod)3 catalyzes the cyclocondensations of substituted dienes with aromatic and aliphatic aldehydes to yield dihydropyrans, with high selectivity for the endo product.

See also 
 Samarium compounds
 Terbium compounds

References

External reading 

Yi Xianwu, Huang Chunhui, Wang Wei, Liu Yujiu, Wu Jinguang. Inorganic Chemistry Series Vol.7 Scandium and Rare Earth Elements. Beijing: Science Press, 1992. ISBN 9787030305749.
The Handbook of Synthesis of Inorganic Compounds Vol.2. Beijing: Chemical Industry Press, 1986. CSBN 15063·3726 (Synthesis of Inorganic Compounds II. Tokyo: Maruzen Co., Ltd., 1977) Edited by the Chemical Society of Japan. Translated by An Jiaju and Chen Zhichuan.

|
Chemical compounds by element